Free in Deed is a 2015 American-New Zealand drama film directed by Jake Mahaffy. It was won the award for Best Film in the Horizons section of the 72nd Venice International Film Festival.

Cast
 David Harewood as Abe Wilkins
 Edwina Findley as Melva Neddy
 RaJay Chandler as Benny
 Kathy Smith as Pearlie
 Porsha Ferguson as Church Member
 Prophetess Libra as Mother
 Preston Shannon as Bishop

References

External links
 

2015 films
2015 drama films
American drama films
New Zealand drama films
2010s English-language films
2010s American films